Bohdan Bartosiewicz pseud. "Bartek" (21 October 1918 – 2 December 2015) was a Polish basketball and volleyball player and coach. He was bronze medalist of the European Basketball Championship in 1939.

Achievements

Based on unless otherwise noted.

National team
bronze medalist of the European Basketball Championship (1939),

Team
Polish champion and vice-champion in basketball,
three-time Polish champion and bronze medalist in volleyball.

Individual
twice participant in the European Basketball Championships,
representative of Poland in basketball and volleyball,
special distinction "for the entirety of activities for Warsaw sport" in the plebiscite for the best sportsmen of Warsaw in 2007

Coaching
vice-championship of Poland and two bronze medals the Polonia Warszawa women's team

Commemoration
Since 2017, Polonia Warsaw organizes women's basketball tournament in memory of Bohdan Bartosiewicz.

References

External links
Profile at fibaeurope.com

Polish men's basketball players
Polish basketball coaches
1918 births
2015 deaths